Terry Jean Wilson (born 1954) is an international leader in the study of present-day tectonics in Antarctica. She has led large, international efforts, such as Polar Earth Observing Network (POLENET), to investigate the interactions between the earth's crust and the cryosphere in Antarctica.

Early life and education 
Wilson received her BS from the University of Michigan and Ph.D from Lamont Doherty Geological Observatory and Columbia University in 1983.

Career and impact 
Wilson is based at Ohio State University where she investigates the Earth's structural architecture, the interaction between ice sheets in Antarctica and the solid Earth and neotectonic rifting.  Her research integrates satellite remote sensing, Global Positioning Systems, both airborne and marine geophysical data and microstructural and structural mapping of faults in sedimentary and outcrop rock cores.

Awards and honors 
Wilson has held several high-profile leadership positions in Antarctic Science:
 Vice President of the Scientific Committee on Antarctic Research (SCAR).
 USA's delegate to SCAR, serving as VP.
 Chief Officer of SCARs Scientific research programme, ‘Solid Earth Response and influence on Cryosphere Evolution’  (SERCE).
 Leader of the geoscience component of the first Antarctic Science Horizon Scan.
 Principal Investigator of POLENET, a major Antarctic programme devoted to observing the polar regions and investigating ice sheet behaviour in a changing world.

Selected works 
Wilson, T.J., 1999. Cenozoic structural segmentation of the Transantarctic Mountains rift flank in southern Victoria Land. Global and Planetary Change,23(1), pp. 105–127.
Wilson, T.J., Grunow, A.M. and Hanson, R.E., 1997. Gondwana assembly: the view from southern Africa and East Gondwana. Journal of Geodynamics,23(3), pp. 263–286.
Fielding, C.R., Whittaker, J., Henrys, S.A., Wilson, T.J. and Naish, T.R., 2008. Seismic facies and stratigraphy of the Cenozoic succession in McMurdo Sound, Antarctica: Implications for tectonic, climatic and glacial history. Palaeogeography, Palaeoclimatology, Palaeoecology, 260(1), pp. 8–29.
Lough, A.C., Wiens, D.A., Barcheck, C.G., Anandakrishnan, S., Aster, R.C., Blankenship, D.D., Huerta, A.D., Nyblade, A., Young, D.A. and Wilson, T.J., 2013. Seismic detection of an active subglacial magmatic complex in Marie Byrd Land, Antarctica. Nature Geoscience, 6(12), pp. 1031–1035.
Kennicutt, M.C., Chown, S.L., Cassano, J.J., Liggett, D., Massom, R., Peck, L.S., Rintoul, S.R., Storey, J.W.V., Vaughan, D.G., Wilson, T.J. and Sutherland, W.J., 2014. Six priorities for Antarctic science. Nature,512(7512), pp. 23–25.

References

External links 
 Terry Wilson's webpage

American geologists
1954 births
Living people
University of Michigan alumni
Columbia University alumni
American Antarctic scientists
Ohio State University faculty
Women Antarctic scientists
American women geologists
American women academics
21st-century American women scientists